GCK may refer to:

 Government College, Kasaragod, in Kerala, India
 Garden City Regional Airport, in Kansas, United States
 GCK Lions, a Swiss hockey team
 Georges Creek Railway, in Maryland, United States
 Glucokinase
 Government College, Kattappana, in Kerala, India
 MAP4K2, an enzyme
 GC Kompetition, a French motorsport team